The 1997–98 English football season was Derby County's second consecutive season in the FA Premier League (known as the FA Carling Premiership for sponsorship reasons).

Season summary
Derby County began life at their new stadium by progressing further on the previous season's solid 12th-place finish. Jim Smith's team emerged as surprise contenders for a UEFA Cup place, and European qualification (for the first time in over 20 years) was still a possibility on the final day of the season. But results didn't go Derby's way, and that final European place went to Aston Villa.

The end-of-season arrival of Argentine defender Horacio Carbonari gave Derby fans fresh hope of challenging for a place in Europe.

Final league table

Results summary

Results by round

Results
Derby County's score comes first

Legend

FA Premier League

FA Cup

League Cup

First-team squad
Squad at end of season

Left club during season

Reserve squad

Transfers

In

Out

Transfers in:  £6,000,000
Transfers out:  £3,535,000
Total spending:  £2,465,000

Notes

References

Derby County F.C. seasons
Derby County